Bob Malone is an American musician who has recorded both solo and as a session musician for several notable artists, including Ringo Starr and John Fogerty, with whom he has toured and recorded since 2011.

Malone has released eight studio albums, beginning with 1996's The Darkest Part of the Night.

Albums

Studio albums

Live albums

Live video albums

Compilations

Singles

Solo singles

As sideman or guest

Albums

Singles

References

Discographies of American artists